Ridgeland may refer to:
Ridgeland, Mississippi
Ridgeland, Wisconsin
Ridgeland, South Carolina
Ridgelands, Queensland, Australia